Macrocossus caducus is a moth in the family Cossidae. It is found in Liberia.

References

Natural History Museum Lepidoptera generic names catalog

Cossinae